Pyotr Nikolaevich Lebedev (24 February 1866 – 1 March 1912) was a Russian physicist. His name was also transliterated as Peter Lebedew and Peter Lebedev. Lebedev was a creator of first scientific school in Russia.

Career
Lebedev made his doctoral degree in Strasbourg under the supervision of August Kundt in 1887–1891. In 1891, he started working in Moscow State University in the group of Alexander Stoletov. There he made his famous experimental studies of electromagnetic waves.

Along with Indian physicist Jagadish Chandra Bose he was one of the first to investigate millimeter waves, generating 50 GHz (6 mm) microwaves beginning in 1895 with a spark oscillator made of two platinum cylinders 1.5 cm long and 0.5 diameter immersed in kerosene at the focus of a parabolic reflector, and detecting the waves with an iron-constantan thermocouple detector.

With this apparatus he extended the work of Heinrich Hertz to higher frequencies, duplicating classical optics experiments using quasioptical components such as lenses, prisms and quarter-wave plates made of sulfur and wire diffraction gratings to demonstrate refraction, diffraction, double refraction, birefringence and polarization of millimeter waves.

He was the first to measure the pressure of light on a solid body in 1899. The discovery was announced at the World Physics Congress in Paris in 1900, and became the first quantitative confirmation of Maxwell's theory of electromagnetism.

Later life 
In 1901, he became a professor of Moscow State University, however he quit the University in 1911, protesting against the politics of the Ministry of Education. In the same year he received an invitation to become a professor in Stockholm, which he rejected. He died the next year.

Legacy 
The Lebedev Physical Institute in Moscow and the lunar crater Lebedev are named after him.

See also
Pyotr Lebedev (research vessel)

References

1866 births
1912 deaths
Russian physicists
Academic staff of Moscow State University
Saint Petersburg State Institute of Technology alumni